Fuente-Olmedo is a municipality located in the province of Valladolid, Castile and León, Spain.  (INE), the municipality has a population of  45 inhabitants.

References

Municipalities in the Province of Valladolid